The Cheongju Han clan (Hangul: 청주 한씨, Hanja: 淸州 韓氏) is a Korean royal family as well-known for the many female members including six queens. It is also called the House of Han or the Han clan of Cheongju. 

The Chengju Han clan is considered one of the most prominent clans since the Gojoseon period, currently, the Cheongju Han is known as a clan that has long been prominent in Korean politics, public service, business and arts.

History 
In the Silla dynasty, all of the Cheongju Hans were part of the seonggol rank. The clan provided the largest number of generals during the Joseon dynasty and were considered the highest of the yangban class, next to the royal Jeonju Yi clan. 

The members of the Han clan are descendants of the sage Jizi (or Gija), who was a noble from the Chinese Shang dynasty, and rode his white horse and set a nation in "The Farthest East". Their founder was King Jun, the last monarch of the Gija period, during the ancient Gojoseon Kingdom. The nobles with the surname Han were greatly praised, and not to be bothered.

The Cheongju Han clan is well-known for the many female members who produced most royal consorts including most six queens. They had produced six queens, five princesses consort, three royal concubines, 315 scholars, 12 Sangshin, 14 Gongshin, and 1 Daejejak throughout the Joseon dynasty.

Queen Wisuk, the mother of Goryeo's founder, Wang Geon, was part of the clan. Another member was Queen Insu, wife of Crown Prince Uigyeong, and the first female author in Korean history, who wrote Naehun, a Confucian morality guidebook for women.

Genealogy book 
The Cheongju Han's genealogy records (jokbo; 族譜) written by Han Hyo-jung, Han Hyuk and others in 1617, during the Joseon dynasty, is considered important bibliographically. In addition, the overall system and recording method are different from other genealogies, having a feature that places great importance on royal records.

Living members 

Han Duck-soo, the 34th Prime Minister of South Korea
Han Myeong-sook, the 33rd Prime Minister of South Korea (as the first female)
Han Min-goo, Minister of National Defense (2014 – 2017)
Han Kang, novelist
Han Sung-joo, Minister of Foreign Affairs (1993 – 1994) and Ambassador to the United States (2003 – 2005)
Han Seung-soo, the 35th Prime Minister of South Korea and President of the United Nations General Assembly (2001 – 2002)
Han Terra, South Korean polymath

Royalty of the Chinese Ming dynasty 
Consort Kanghuizhuangshuli of the Korean Cheongju Han clan (康惠莊淑麗妃) (late 14th century – 1424); married to Yongle Emperor.
Lady Gongshen of the Korean Cheongju Han clan (恭慎夫人 清州韓氏) (1410 – 1483); younger sister of Consort Kanghuizhuangshuli; married to Xuande Emperor.

Royalty of the Goryeo dynasty 

 Queen Wisuk, mother of Goryeo's founder, Wang Geon, King Taejo

Royalty of the Joseon dynasty 

 Queen Sinui
 Queen Jangsun
Queen Insu
Queen Ansun
Queen Gonghye
Queen Inyeol
Royal Consort Gwi-in
 Royal Consort Sug-ui
 Royal Noble Consort On
 Princess Uihye (by marriage)
 Princess Jeonghye (by marriage)
 Princess Gongshin (by marriage)
 Princess Jeongshin (by marriage)

See also 

 Korean clans of foreign origin
Korean nobility
Bone-rank system
Yangban
House of Yi
Emperor of Japan
Emperor of China

References 

 
Han clans